Washington Square Park is a park in New York City.

Washington Square Park may also refer to:

Places
Washington Square Park (Chicago)
Washington Square Park (Philadelphia)
Washington Square Park (Rochester, New York)
Washington Square Park (San Francisco)
Washington Square Park (Salt Lake City)
Washington Square Park, the location of San Jose State University

Arts, entertainment and media

Music
"Washington Square Park", a 1997 song by The Get Up Kids from Four Minute Mile
"Washington Square Park", a 2010 song by The Wonder Years from The Upsides

See also
Washington Square (disambiguation)
Washington Park (disambiguation)
Washington Square Historic District (disambiguation)